Concordia was a steel-hulled barquentine that was built in Poland in 1992 for the West Island College, Montreal, Canada. She served as a sail training ship until she capsized and sank on 17 February 2010.

Description
Concordia was built by Colod of Szczecin, Poland in 1991, and completed in April 1992. Her hull was made of steel, and she was rigged as a barquentine.

History

Concordia was designed by Ryszard Langer and owned by the West Island College Class Afloat program. Her port of registry was Bridgetown, Barbados but she was based in Lunenburg, Nova Scotia. On 5 December 1996, an explosion on board during battery charging resulted in the death of a crew member, 18-year-old Derek Zavitz. Zavitz was thrown overboard and his remains were never found.

Sinking

The vessel was knocked onto its side within 15 seconds and eventually sank 20 minutes afterward.

While there was probably a vertical component to the wind, there is no evidence that a microburst occurred at the time of the knockdown." The report also found the vessel was operated in a way that did not allow it to, "...react to changing weather conditions appropriately and maintain the stability of the vessel."

All aboard successfully abandoned ship. As the capsizing was so fast, no radio distress call was made but an EPIRB was hydrostatically released and automatically activated when the vessel sank.

The Concordia sank at 1423 hrs local time Wednesday.  At 1425 Concordia's Bosun Geoffrey Byers swam to retrieve the EPIRB and brought it aboard the rafts. The Captain directed that someone hold the EPIRB upright at all times and keep it safe from damage. The EPIRB signal was received at 1505 hrs by the Geostationary Operational Environmental Satellite GOES 12. The position of the sinking, was resolved at 1525 local time. The TSB report noted the EPIRB database only listed one telephone number for the Concordia and that number had not been in service since 2004.

The following morning at 0806 hrs the Maritime Rescue Coordination Centre Brazil sent a fax to Joint Rescue Coordination Centre Halifax requesting information about the Concordia.
After attempting to contact  Concordia a Brazilian Air Force aircraft was dispatched at 1700 hrs local time Thursday and sighted the liferafts 3 hours later.

The survivors spent nearly 30 hours in liferafts before the aircraft spotted them. Flares were fired from the rafts, and the aircraft blinked its landing lights in response and directed nearby merchant ships to the scene.

41 hours after the sinking the crew were safely aboard the rescue ships. All 64 people (48 students, eight teachers and eight crew) who were on board were rescued from 3 large and 1 small liferafts.

References

External links

Transportation Safety Board of Canada Marine Reports – 2010 – M10F0003 Knockdown and Capsizing – Sail Training Yacht Concordia 300 miles SSE off Rio de Janeiro, Brazil Also available as PDF (4715 kB) 
"Class AfloatTM"
"Concordia Image Gallery"
Tall Ship Down. 21 minute documentary of SV Concordia's last voyage. CBC
Abandon Ship: The Sinking of the SV Concordia A 45-minute CBC documentary on the sinking of the SV Concordia, first broadcast 10 February 2011
https://archive.today/20130118200345/http://www.canald.com/emissions/docu-d/505646973-abandonnez-le-navire-le-naufrage-du-concordia/ Abandonnez le navire: Le naufrage du Concordia

1992 ships
Tall ships of the Bahamas
Tall ships of Bermuda
Individual sailing vessels
Barquentines
Shipwrecks in the Atlantic Ocean
Maritime incidents in 2010
Maritime incidents in Brazil
2010 in Brazil
Ships built in Szczecin
Lost sailing vessels